Waiau is a small town in north Canterbury, in the South Island of New Zealand. There is a small supermarket, a DIY store and a petrol station.

History 
Waiau is the largest town on State Highway 70, also known as the Inland Kaikoura Route. From 1919 until 1978, Waiau was the terminus of the Waiau Branch, a branch line railway that ran to the town from a junction with the Main North Line in Waipara.

Waiau had at one stage, three churches. A Presbyterian church, an Anglican church and a Catholic Church.   The Catholic Parish of the Good Shepard was opened in 1900 and has seating for 100. 

Waiau was heavily impacted by the 2016 Kaikoura earthquake as the epicentre was 15 kilometres (9 mi) north-east of Culverden making it more like the Waiau earthquake. Buildings damaged by the earthquake include many homes, the Waiau Lodge Hotel, historic cottage, bowling green, church, netball courts and swimming pool. In 2021 the town still bears many scars from the earthquake.

Waiau shares its name with several much smaller settlements and farming communities within New Zealand. The name is Māori, and means flowing water.

Demographics
Culverden is included in Amuri statistical area.

Waiau had a population of 255 at the 2018 New Zealand census, a decrease of 3 people (-1.2%) since the 2013 census, and an increase of 3 people (1.2%) since the 2006 census. There were 99 households. There were 126 males and 123 females, giving a sex ratio of 1.02 males per female, with 51 people (20.0%) aged under 15 years, 27 (10.6%) aged 15 to 29, 123 (48.2%) aged 30 to 64, and 48 (18.8%) aged 65 or older.

Ethnicities were 88.2% European/Pākehā, 21.2% Māori, 2.4% Pacific peoples, and 1.2% other ethnicities (totals add to more than 100% since people could identify with multiple ethnicities).

Although some people objected to giving their religion, 67.1% had no religion, 24.7% were Christian, 1.2% were Hindu and 2.4% had other religions.

Of those at least 15 years old, 12 (5.9%) people had a bachelor or higher degree, and 75 (36.8%) people had no formal qualifications. The employment status of those at least 15 was that 99 (48.5%) people were employed full-time, 36 (17.6%) were part-time, and 9 (4.4%) were unemployed.

Education

Swimming Pool 
The Waiau Community Pool was built in 2019. The complex includes a 25 metre swimming pool and a smaller toddlers pool.

Waiau Lodge Hotel 
The Waiau Lodge Hotel was built in 1910. It originally had ten bedrooms for guests. The hotel was known as the "Grand Lady". Frederick O'Malley was the first publican to run the Waiau Lodge Hotel. He sold the hotel in 1913 to Arthur Johnstone. There have been a further 21 owners. The hotel was badly damaged in the 2016 Kaikoura earthquake. All three of the hotel's chimneys had crashed through the roof causing extensive damage. A temporary pub called the Waiau Tavern was set up in the car park for the town's residents and opened six months later. In May 2021, the Waiau Lodge Hotel was destroyed by a fire. Approximately thirty firefighters attempted to put out the fire which started late at night.

References

External links

Populated places in Canterbury, New Zealand
Hurunui District